Privileged Woes is the debut studio album by Australian indie rock band Oh Mercy, released in August 2009.

At the J Awards of 2009, the album was nominated for Australian Album of the Year. The album was also nominated for the 2009 Australian Music Prize.

Track listing 
 "Lay Everything On Me" - 3:08
 "Seemed Like a Good Idea" - 2:41
 "Met a Wizard" - 3:40
 "Get You Back" - 3:07
 "By the Collar" - 3:01
 "Astrid, No" - 3:19
 "Broken Ears"	- 3:34
 "In Good Time" - 3:09
 "Can't Fight It" - 2:12
 "Couldn't Let You Drown" - 2:59
 "What Good Is That" - 3:40

Charts

References 

2009 debut albums
Oh Mercy (band) albums